Ma On Shan Sports Ground is a multi-use sports ground located in Ma On Shan, Sha Tin, Hong Kong. It was built at a cost of HK$153 million and opened in 1999. The sports ground is managed by the Leisure and Cultural Services Department.

History
Ma On Shan was opened by Lau Wong-fat on 28 December 1999. During construction the completion date was seriously delayed due to contractor bankruptcy. Work was taken over by the Architectural Services Department in December 1997 who completed construction.

Activities
Ma On Shan Sports Ground is designed for local sports use including schools and company sports days. When the venue is not booked, it is open to the public for jogging.

Due to the 2008 Olympics Equestrian event in Sha Tin, the Sports Institute's track and field athletes were given permission to train exclusively at Ma On Shan Sports Ground every day.

Facilities
Ma On Shan Sports Ground's design is simple and practical. The double deck grandstand is 150m long and can accommodate 1,387 spectators.

Beneath the grandstand are changing rooms and offices. There is an 11-a-side natural grass football field and 400m running track.

See also
 Leisure and Cultural Services Department

References

External links

Leisure and Cultural Services Department

Football venues in Hong Kong
Ma On Shan